Gian Tommaso Scarascia Mugnozza (May 27, 1925 – February 28, 2011) is an Italian agronomist and geneticist. He was born in Rome, Italy.

After graduating in agriculture at the University of Bari in 1946, he started teaching there and became full professor in 1968. He was director of the ENEA Casaccia laboratory in Cesano, Rome. Other positions include; Dean of the Faculty of Agriculture at the University of Bari, chairman of the Agriculture and Forestry Commission of the Italian National Research Council, and rector at Tuscia University at Viterbo. He was president of the Accademia Nazionale delle Scienze and was a fellow of several Italian and foreign academies. His scientific research focused on wheat breeding and adaptation to arid and semi-arid climates. He coordinated national and international research programs in agriculture and plant breeding.

He also served as Rector of Tuscia University

References

External links
Gian Tommaso Scarascia Mugnozza's obituary 

1925 births
2011 deaths
University of Bari alumni
Academic staff of Tuscia University
Italian agronomists
Italian geneticists
National Research Council (Italy) people